"Beautiful Monster" is a song recorded by South Korean girl group STAYC for their third single album We Need Love. It was released as the album's lead single by High Up Entertainment on July 19, 2022.

Background and release
On June 30, 2022, High Up Entertainment announced STAYC would be releasing a new album in July 2022. A day later, it was announced STAYC would be releasing their third single album titled We Need Love on July 19. On July 15, the highlight medley video for We Need Love was released with "Beautiful Monster" announced as the lead single. Three days later, the music video teaser was released.

Composition
"Beautiful Monster" was written and composed by Black Eyed Pilseung, alongside Jeon Goon for the lyrics, and Flyt for the composition, with arrangement handled by Rado and Flyt. The song was described as "capturing the fear hidden behind the happiness of love". "Beautiful Monster" was composed in the key of F-sharp major with a tempo of 82 beats per minute.

Promotion
Prior to the release of We Need Love, STAYC held a live showcase to introduce the single album and its songs, including "Beautiful Monster", and communicate with their fans. The group subsequently performed on three music programs: Mnet's M Countdown on July 21, KBS's Music Bank on July 22, and MBC's Show! Music Core on July 23.

Accolades

Credits and personnel
Credits adapted from We Need Loves liner notes.

Studio
 Ingrid Studio – recording, digital editing
 Vanguard Town – digital editing
 Koko Sound Studio – mixing
 The Mastering Place – mastering

Personnel
 STAYC – vocals, background vocals
 Ashley Alisha – background vocals
 Black Eyed Pilseung – lyrics, composition, production
 Jeon Goon – lyrics, composition, production
 Flyt – arrangement, bass, production
 Rado – arrangement, drums, digital editing
 Jeong Eun-kyung – recording, digital editing
 Yang Young-eun – recording
 Drk – mixing
 Kim Jun-sang – mixing (assistant)
 Ji Min-woo – mixing (assistant)
 On Seong-yoon – mixing (assistant)
 Kim Joon-young – mixing (assistant)
 Dave Kutch – mastering

Charts

Weekly charts

Monthly charts

Release history

References

2022 songs
2022 singles
STAYC songs
Song recordings produced by Black Eyed Pilseung